Hits Are for Squares is the first greatest hits album by American rock band Sonic Youth, released on June 10, 2008, by Starbucks Entertainment. It contains fifteen previously released songs, as well as one brand new track, "Slow Revolution".

Background and release
On June 15, 2007, Thurston Moore announced that Sonic Youth was recording a new song for a compilation album under Starbucks Entertainment. Due to the decline of record stores in the 2000s, the band strived to expand upon their audience through partnering with the company. The band initially reached out to Starbucks to promote their fourteenth studio album Rather Ripped (2006) in the company's coffeehouses, however, this suggestion was halted by a six-month approval process. As a result, the band opted to make a compilation album under the company that would appeal to the casual consumer. With Billboard, Moore shared his thoughts on the release:
In a way, Sonic Youth has a branded name. People know the name, but not necessarily our music, which might be a little too outsider for some. And when they do hear a little something, it doesn't tell the whole story. I thought it would be interesting to have a CD available in a store like Starbucks where the casual consumer can sort of have access to [our music] more readily.

On July 2, 2007, Sonic Youth issued a press release in which they confirmed the name of the album as Hits Are for Squares and announced a tentative release date of early 2008. The band also confirmed that the album would be co-released under Starbucks Entertainment and Universal Special Markets. On May 21, 2008, the band officially announced the release date as June 10, 2008. The album featured fifteen previously released songs in addition to one new recording titled "Slow Revolution". The fifteen previously released songs were individually selected by celebrities for inclusion, including Catherine Keener, Mike D, Beck, Radiohead, Portia de Rossi, Diablo Cody, Allison Anders, Dave Eggers, Mike Watt, Eddie Vedder, Michelle Williams, Flea, Gus Van Sant, David Cross, Chloë Sevigny, and The Flaming Lips. Approximately 1,000 copies of the album were printed as CDs for purchase at select Starbucks locations, although the album was also made available for digital download. On April 17, 2010, the album was reissued as a vinyl for Record Store Day.

Critical reception

Heather Phares of AllMusic praised the album, in which she stated that it "works surprisingly well as an introduction to Sonic Youth's sound and approach."

Track listing

References 

2008 compilation albums
Sonic Youth compilation albums
Hear Music compilation albums